The First Affiliated Hospital of Zhengzhou University (ZDYFY) is an affiliated hospital of Zhengzhou University, a public university in Zhengzhou, China. With more than 7,000 beds provided and an annual revenue of 7.5 billion Yuan in 2014, the hospital claims itself as "the largest hospital in the world."

History
The hospital was established as the First Affiliated Hospital of National Henan University in September 1928 in Kaifeng, the then capital of Henan province. It was relocated to Zhengzhou in 1958 and was renamed as the First Affiliated Hospital of Henan Medical College. In 2000, with the merger of Zhengzhou University, Zhengzhou Institute of Technology and Henan Medical University, the hospital was renamed to its current name.

References

Zhengzhou University
Hospitals in Henan
Buildings and structures in Zhengzhou
1928 establishments in China
Hospitals established in 1928